Azmour is a small town and commune in the Nabeul Governorate, located in the Cape Bon peninsula of Tunisia, bounded to the north by El Haouaria, to the south by Kélibia, east by Hammam Ghezèze and west by Menzel Temime.

As of 2004 it had 5,001 inhabitants.

Azmour hosted the Festival of Sidi Maaouia Echêref from 5 to 7 August 2003.

Notable people
Naama (singer)

References

Populated places in Tunisia
Communes of Tunisia